Arne Strand (born 17 March 1944) is a Norwegian journalist and politician for the Labour Party. He is the current political editor in the newspaper Dagsavisen.

Strand graduated from the University of Oslo with the cand.mag. degree in 1968. He worked as a journalist in Vårt Land from 1964 to 1966, in Arbeiderbladet from 1966 to 1976, and in the Norwegian Broadcasting Corporation from 1976 to 1987. Between 1987 and 1989 he was a State Secretary in the Office of the Prime Minister, as a part of Gro Harlem Brundtland's second cabinet.

Having been political editor and news editor in his later years with the Norwegian Broadcasting Corporation, in 1990 he was hired as political editor in Arbeiderbladet, which in 1997 changed its name to as Dagsavisen. He was acting editor-in-chief from 2004 to 2005 and from 2009. From 1999 to 2006 he chaired the Norwegian branch of the International Press Institute.

He is the adoptive father of the television host Christian Strand.

References

1944 births
Living people
Norwegian newspaper editors
Norwegian state secretaries
Labour Party (Norway) politicians
University of Oslo alumni
Dagsavisen editors